King Vuniyayawa (born 13 March 1995) is a Fijian professional rugby league footballer who plays as a  or for the Salford Red Devils in the Betfred Super League and Fiji at international level.

He has previously played for the New Zealand Warriors in the NRL and the Leeds Rhinos in the Super League.

Background
Vuniyayawa was born in Lautoka, Fiji.

Career
In 2018, Vuniyayawa was selected to represent Fiji vs Papua New Guinea. Vuniyayawa made his NRL debut in Round 1, 2020, in the Warriors' 20–0 loss against the Newcastle Knights.

Leeds
On 16 January 2021, it was reported that he had signed for Leeds in the Super League.
On 9 October, Vuniyayawa signed a two-year contract to join Salford.

Salford
On 9 October 2021  Salford announced the signing of Fijian international King Vuniyayawa on a two-year contract. Following Salford's 30-14 victory over Castleford in May 2022, Vuniyayawa was ruled out of the remainder of the 2022 season with a pectoral injury. King made a remarkable recovery and made returned to first team action in the resounding Round 26 victory away at Castleford.

References

External links
Leeds Rhinos profile
Warriors profile
Fiji profile

1995 births
Living people
Fijian rugby league players
Fijian sportspeople
Fijian expatriate sportspeople in England
Fiji national rugby league team players
Leeds Rhinos players
New Zealand Warriors players
New Zealand expatriate sportspeople in England
Rugby league second-rows
Sportspeople from Lautoka